Malayotyphlops collaris, also known as the collared worm snake or light-collared blind snake, is a species of snake in the Typhlopidae family.

References

collaris
Reptiles described in 1993